Uno Sanli (born 5 January 1989 in Eskilstuna) is a Swedish taekwondo athlete. He competed at the 2012 Summer Olympics in the men's -58 kg division. Currently he lives in Skärholmen.

References

Living people
1989 births
Swedish male taekwondo practitioners
People from Eskilstuna
Olympic taekwondo practitioners of Sweden
Taekwondo practitioners at the 2012 Summer Olympics
Sportspeople from Södermanland County
21st-century Swedish people